A Man for All Seasons is a 1988 American made-for-television drama film about St. Thomas More, directed by and starring Charlton Heston. It is based on the play of the same name by Robert Bolt, which was previously adapted in the Academy Award winning 1966 film A Man for All Seasons. It was the first made-for-television film produced on behalf of the TNT (Turner Network Television) television network.

The film stars Heston as More, Vanessa Redgrave (who had a small cameo in the version from 1966) as his wife Alice More, Sir John Gielgud as Cardinal Thomas Wolsey, Martin Chamberlain as King Henry VIII, Richard Johnson as the Duke of Norfolk (historically, Thomas Howard, 3rd Duke of Norfolk), and Roy Kinnear as the narrator, "The Common Man", who was cut from the previous film. (The "Common Man' functions in the manner of a Greek chorus throughout the play, appearing at crucial moments and seeming to comment on the action.)

The film follows the original stage play more literally and runs half an hour longer than the 1966 film, and could be considered "stagier" than that film, which divided the Common Man into several more realistic characters and omitted portions of the play.

Plot
King Henry VIII wants to divorce his wife, and seeks the approval of the aristocracy. Sir Thomas More is a man of principle and reason, and is thus placed in a difficult position: should he stand up for his principles, risking the wrath of a corrupt King fond of executing people for treason? Or should he bow to the seemingly unstoppable corruption of King Henry VIII, who has no qualms about bending the law to suit his own needs?

Cast
 Charlton Heston as Sir Thomas More
 Vanessa Redgrave as Alice More
 Richard Johnson as the Duke of Norfolk
 John Gielgud as Thomas Wolsey 
 Roy Kinnear as the Narrator
 Benjamin Whitrow as Thomas Cromwell
 Adrienne Thomas as Margaret Roper 
 Martin Chamberlain as Henry VIII
 John Hudson as William Roper
 Jonathan Hackett as Richard Rich
 Milton Cadman as Thomas Cranmer
 Nicholas Amer as Eustace Chapuys

Reception 
The film received generally positive critic reviews.

Home media

Warner Bros. released a DVD in 2011.

External links 
 
 

1988 television films
1988 films
1988 drama films
American biographical drama films
American films based on plays
Films set in Tudor England
Films about Christianity
Films about lawyers
Films about Henry VIII
Films shot at Pinewood Studios
Films directed by Charlton Heston
TNT Network original films
Television series produced at Pinewood Studios
Films with screenplays by Robert Bolt
American drama television films
1980s American films